The Unleashed Tour was a concert tour by the rock band Fleetwood Mac. The tour ran from March 1, to December 20, 2009 in the United States, Canada, Germany, Ireland, the United Kingdom, Australia and New Zealand and was the band's first tour in five years, the group featured tracks within the setlist that spanned "all the Mac's many greatest hits" and pulled two rarely played live tracks 'Storms' and 'I Know I'm Not Wrong' that were taken from the Tusk album and resurrected the Peter Green track 'Oh Well' for the first time live since 1995. The tour ranked #13 in the Worldwide Concert Tours data that is maintained by Pollstar and grossed a total of $84.9 million with a total attendance of 832,597.

Background 
This was the first tour that the later Rumours-era band of Fleetwood Mac had undertaken without a new album to promote, Christine McVie did not participate in this tour as she had retired from the group in 1998. In addition Stevie Nicks spoke about Sheryl Crow potentially joining the band to add an additional female to the group dynamic in the absence of Christine McVie. The group were also planning to re-release their Rumours album from 1977 as a CD/DVD combo with unreleased songs, demos and previously unreleased footage of the band from that era, however this re-release never materialised and was held back to 2013 when the Rumours deluxe and super-deluxe editions were released.

Tour dates

Set List 
 "Monday Morning"
 "The Chain"
 "Dreams"
 "I Know I'm Not Wrong"
 "Gypsy"
 "Go Insane"
 "Rhiannon"
 "Second Hand News"
 "Tusk"
 "Sara"
 "Big Love"
 "Landslide"
 "Never Going Back Again"
 "Storms"
 "Say You Love Me"
 "Gold Dust Woman"
 "Oh Well"
 "I'm So Afraid"
 "Stand Back"
 "Go Your Own Way"

First encore
 "World Turning"
  "Drum solo"
 "Don't Stop"

Second encore
 "Silver Springs"

Personnel

Fleetwood Mac 
 Lindsey Buckingham – lead guitar, vocals
 Stevie Nicks – vocals, tambourine
 John McVie – bass guitar
 Mick Fleetwood – drums, percussion

Supporting musicians 
 Brett Tuggle – keyboards, rhythm guitar, backing vocals, maracas on "Oh Well"
 Neale Heywood – rhythm guitar, backing vocals
 Sharon Celani – background vocals
 Jana Andeson – background vocals
 Lori Nicks – background vocals

References 

2009 concert tours
Fleetwood Mac concert tours